Suberites is a genus of sea sponges in the family Suberitidae.
Sponges, known scientifically as Porifera, are the oldest metazoans and are used to elucidate the basics of multicellular evolution. These living fossils are ideal for studying the principal features of metazoans, such as extracellular matrix interactions, signal-receptor systems, nervous or sensory systems, and primitive immune systems. Thus, sponges are useful tools with which to study early animal evolution. They appeared approximately 580 million years ago, in the Ediacaran.

Evolutionary significance
As members of the oldest phylum of metazoans, Suberites serve as model organisms to elucidate features of the earliest animals. 
Suberites and their relatives are used to determine the structure of the first metazoans 
 and have been studied to determine how totipotency has replaced by pluripotency in most higher animals. Among other things, Suberites show that tyrosine-phosphorylation machinery evolved in animals independently from other eukaryotes. Suberites are also used as models to elucidate the evolution of transmembrane receptors and cell-junction proteins.
A combination of stem cell and apoptosis factors studies is used as a model for studies of development in higher animals.

Ecology
Suberites are a global genus. One species, Suberites zeteki, is found in Hawaii. S. zeteki associates with many fungi. Another, S. japonicas, is native to the waters around Japan. S. aurantiacus is found in the Caribbean sea. S.carnosus lives in the Indian Ocean and in the Mediterranean Sea and can also be found in Irish waters. S. diversicolor can be found in Indonesia. Due to Suberites’ ability to efficiently filter water, many microbes, especially fungal species, are filtered through. If these microbes escape digestion, they can deposit on the sponge and reside there indefinitely. Symbiotic bacteria produce toxins, such as okadaic acid, which defend them from colonization by parasitic annelids. Expression of various enzymes by Suberites influences the growth of their symbiotic bacteria. Suberites often live on the shells on the mollusk Hexaplex trunculus. Suberites have mechanisms of defense against predation, such as the toxic chemicals found below.

Physiology
Suberites display neuronal communications, but neuronal networks are mysteriously missing. However, they do have many of the same sensory receptors and signals found in higher animals. Researchers in China and Germany have found that sponge spicules contribute to their neural communication. In effect, the silicaceous structures act as fiber optic cables to convey light signals generated from the protein luciferase. The sponges generate light from luciferin, after it is acted upon by luciferase. Suberites have also been shown to produce light in response to tactile stimulation. Suberites consist mostly of cells, in contrast with other Porifera (such as the class Hexactinellida) which are syncytial. As a result, Suberites have slower reaction times in their neural communication. Suberites  utilized many Ras-like GTPases which are used for signaling and affect development. According to comparative studies, Suberites have some of the most simple indicator proteins, such as collagen, of known animals. Like all sponges, Suberites are filter-feeders. They are extremely efficient and can process thousands of liters of water per day.  S. domuncula has been used for study of graft rejection. Researchers have discovered that apoptotic factors are induced in the tissue that is rejected.

Development
Suberites consist of many telomerase-positive cells, which means the cells are essentially immortal, barring cell death signal. In most cases, the signal is a lack of connection either to the extracellular matrix or other cells. Their apoptotic cells are similar to homologous to mammalian. However, maintenance of long-lived cells involves proteins such as SDLAGL that are highly similar to yeast and human homologs. Certain inorganic materials, such as iron and selenium, influence the growth of Suberites, including the primmorph growth and spicule formation. Suberites undergo cell differentiation through a variety of mechanisms based on cell-cell communication.

Morphology
Suberites are key examples of the importance of the extracellular matrix in animals. In sponges, it is mediated by proteoglycans. Spicule formation is also important for Suberites. Spicules are structural support of sponges, similar to skeletons in higher animals. They are normally hollow structures that are formed by lamellar growth. Whereas higher animal skeletons are largely calcium-based, sponge spicules consist mostly of silica, a silicon dioxide polymer. These inorganic structures provide support for the animals. The spicules are biologically-formed silica structures, also known as biosilica. Silica deposition begins intracellularly and is carried out by the enzyme silicatein. Silicateins are modulated by a group of proteins called silintaphins. The process occurs in specialized cells known as sclerocytes. Biosilica formation in Suberites differs from other species that utilize biosilica in this regard. Most other species, such as certain plants and diatoms, simply deposit a supersaturated biosilica solution. The network of silica found in sponges mediates much of the sponges’ neural communications.

Immunity and defense
Suberites show the cytokine-like molecule allograft inflammatory factor one (AIF-1), which is similar to vertebrate AIF-1. Immune response relies on phosphorylation cascades involving the p38 kinase. S. domuncula was the first demonstrated immune response of invertebrate species (1). These sponges also have similar graft-response inflammation to vertebrates. Their immune systems are much simpler than vertebrates; they consist of only innate immunity. Because they filter thousands of liters of water per day, and their environment contains a high concentration of bacteria and viruses, Suberites have developed a highly potent system of immunity. Despite the efficiency of their immune systems, Suberites can be susceptible to infection which often stimulates cell death through apoptotic pathways.

Suberites, namely S. domuncula, defend themselves from macroscopic threats with a neurotoxin known as suberitine. It was the first known protein discovered in a sponge. The neurotoxic properties of suberitine arise from its ability to block action potentials. It additionally has hemolytic properties, which do not originate from phospholipase A activity. It has some antibacterial activity; however, the extent of the activity due solely to suberitine is not currently defined. The sponge itself neutralizes the toxin through a pathway that is not fully understood, but involves retinal, a β-carotene metabolite. S. japonicas also produces several cytotoxic compounds, seragamides A-F. The seragamides act by interfering with cytoskeleton activity, specifically the actin microfilaments. The activity of the seragamides is a possible route for anti-cancer drugs, similar to existing drugs which target microtubules. Suberites also produce cytotoxic compounds known as nakijinamines, which resemble other toxins found in Suberites, but the role of the nakijinamines has not yet been found. Many of the bioactive compounds found on Suberites are microbial in nature.

Species
The following species are recognised in the genus Suberites:

 Suberites affinis Brøndsted, 1923
 Suberites anastomosus Brøndsted, 1924
 Suberites aurantiacus (Duchassaing & Michelotti, 1864)
 Suberites australiensis Bergquist, 1968
 Suberites axiatus Ridley & Dendy, 1886
 Suberites axinelloides Brøndsted, 1924
 Suberites baffini Brøndsted, 1933
 Suberites bengalensis Lévi, 1964
 Suberites caminatus Ridley & Dendy, 1886
 Suberites carnosus (Johnston, 1842)
 Suberites cebriones Morozov, Sabirov & Zimina, 2019
 Suberites clavatus Keller, 1891
 Suberites concinnus Lambe, 1895
 Suberites cranium Hajdu et al, 2013
 Suberites crelloides Marenzeller, 1886
 Suberites crispolobatus Lambe, 1895
 Suberites cupuloides Bergquist, 1961
 Suberites dandelenae Samaai & Maduray, 2017
 Suberites difficilis Dendy, 1897
 Suberites distortus Schmidt, 1870
 Suberites diversicolor Becking & Lim 2009
 Suberites domuncula (Olivi, 1792)
 Suberites excellens (Thiele, 1898)
 Suberites ficus (Johnston, 1842)
 Suberites flabellatus Carter, 1886
 Suberites gibbosiceps Topsent, 1904
 Suberites glaber Hansen, 1885
 Suberites glasenapii Merejkowski, 1879
 Suberites globosus Carter, 1886
 Suberites heros Schmidt, 1870
 Suberites hirsutus Topsent, 1927
 Suberites holgeri Van Soest & Hooper, 2020
 Suberites hystrix Schmidt, 1868
 Suberites insignis Carter, 1886
 Suberites japonicus Thiele, 1898
 Suberites kelleri Burton, 1930
 Suberites lambei Austin et al., 2014
 Suberites laticeps Topsent, 1904
 Suberites latus Lambe, 1893
 Suberites lobatus (Wilson, 1902)
 Suberites luna Giraldes & Goodwin, 2020
 Suberites luridus Solé-Cava & Thorpe, 1986
 Suberites lutea Sole-Cava & Thorpe, 1986
 Suberites mammilaris Sim & Kim, 1994
 Suberites massa Nardo, 1847
 Suberites microstomus Ridley & Dendy, 1887
 Suberites mineri (de Laubenfels, 1935)
 Suberites mollis Ridley & Dendy, 1886
 Suberites montalbidus Carter, 1880
 Suberites pagurorum Solé-Cava & Thorpe, 1986
 Suberites paradoxus Wilson, 1931
 Suberites perfectus Ridley & Dendy, 1886
 Suberites pisiformis Lévi, 1993
 Suberites placenta Thiele, 1898
 Suberites prototypus Czerniavsky, 1880
 Suberites puncturatus Thiele, 1905
 Suberites purpura Fortunato, Pérez & Lôbo-Hajdu, 2020
 Suberites radiatus Kieschnick, 1896
 Suberites ramosus Brøndsted, 1924
 Suberites rhaphidiophorus (Brøndsted, 1924)
 Suberites ruber Thiele, 1905
 Suberites rubrus Sole-Cava & Thorpe, 1986
 Suberites senilis Ridley & Dendy, 1886
 Suberites sericeus Thiele, 1898
 Suberites spermatozoon (Schmidt, 1875)
 Suberites spirastrelloides Dendy, 1897
 Suberites spongiosus Schmidt, 1868
 Suberites stilensis Burton, 1933
 Suberites strongylatus Sarà, 1978
 Suberites suberia (Montagu, 1818)
 Suberites syringella (Schmidt, 1868)
 Suberites topsenti (Burton, 1929)
 Suberites tortuosus Lévi, 1959
 Suberites tylobtusus Lévi, 1958
 Suberites verrilli Van Soest & Hooper, 2020
 Suberites virgultosus (Johnston, 1842)

References

Suberitidae